is a Japanese publishing company headquartered in Higashigokenchō, Shinjuku, Tokyo, Japan.


List of magazines published by Futabasha

Bravo Ski
Comic Seed!
Futabasha Web Magazine
Manga Action ZERO
Tōji Rō
Getter Robot Saga

Manga
 4koma Manga Kingdom
 Bar Lemon Heart
 Crayon Shin-chan
 Crime and Punishment: A Falsified Romance
 Kodomo no Jikan
 Koizora
 Lupin III
 Lone Wolf and Cub
 My Brother's Husband
 Old Boy
 Oruchuban Ebichu
 Our Colors
 Tsugumomo
 Orange

References

External links

Futabasha's official website 

 
Book publishing companies in Tokyo
Publishing companies established in 1948
Magazine publishing companies in Tokyo
Shinjuku
Japanese companies established in 1948
Comic book publishing companies in Tokyo